Asaphodes ida is a species of moth in the family Geometridae. It is endemic to New Zealand. This moth can be found in upland or alpine habitat in Canterbury and Otago. Although not classified under the New Zealand Threat Classification system this species is regarded as rare.

Taxonomy

This species was described by Charles E. Clarke in 1926 as Xanthorhoe ida using material collected by George Howes in February at Eweburn Stream, Mount Ida in Canterbury. George Hudson discussed and illustrated this species as Xanthorhoe ida in 1928. In 1987 Robin C. Craw, after considering the genital structure of this species, proposed assigning this species to the genus Asaphodes. In 1988 John S. Dugdale agreed with this proposal. The male holotype specimen, collected at Eweburn Stream, Mount Ida, is held at the Auckland War Memorial Museum.

Description

Clarke described the species as follows:

Distribution
This species is endemic to New Zealand. It is found in the Ida Range in Canterbury as well as the Hawkdun Range in Central Otago. This moth is regarded as being rare.

Biology and life cycle
A. ida is on the wing in February.

Habitat and host plant

A. ida frequents upland or alpine wetland habitat at between 800 and 1,100 meters in altitude.

References

Larentiinae
Moths described in 1926
Moths of New Zealand
Endemic fauna of New Zealand
Endemic moths of New Zealand